Sobiatyno  is a village in the administrative district of Gmina Milejczyce, within Siemiatycze County, Podlaskie Voivodeship, in north-eastern Poland.

According to the 1921 census, the village was inhabited by 367 people, among whom 2 were Roman Catholic, 350 Orthodox, and 15 Mosaic. At the same time, 358 inhabitants declared Polish nationality, 9 Jewish. There were 72 residential buildings in the village.

References

Sobiatyno